Satkosia Gorge  is a gorge in eastern Odisha, India, carved by the Mahanadi River. The gorge is located within the Satkosia Tiger Reserve which is a United nations Protected area. It is also a Ramsar site designated in 2021.

Description
Satkosia Gorge is located along the border between Angul and Boudh districts of Odisha , India. It extends for a length of 22 km from Sunakhania village in Boudh to Badmul village downstream. It is a patchwork of rivers, tropical evergreen forests at the meeting point of the Deccan Peninsula and the Eastern Ghats. The habitats here support a variety of flora and fauna. Notable plant species include Asan (Terminalia alata), Dhaura (Anogeissus latifolia), Simili (Bombax ceiba), Indian thorny bamboo (Bambusa arundinacea) and Calcutta bamboo (Dendrocalamus strictus). Notable animal species include red-crowned roofed turtle (Batagur kachuga), Indian narrow-headed softshell turtle (Chitra indica), tiger (Panthera tigris) and black-bellied tern (Sterna acuticauda). 
The gorge is created by the Mahanadi river cutting the eastern Ghats. The gorge and the surrounding area were declared as a tiger sanctuary in 2007.

Geology

Geologically Satkosia gorge is part of the Eastern Ghats. It separates the Chhota Nagpur Plateau from the Eastern Ghats.

Conservation and history
Satkosia Gorge was established in 1976 as a wildlife sanctuary.

See also
Geology of Odisha
Geography of Odisha
Satkosia Tiger Reserve

References

Canyons and gorges of India
Tourist attractions in Cuttack district
Environment of Odisha
Wetlands of India
Ramsar sites in India